Alternate Endings is a compilation album by English post-hardcore band Fightstar, released 11 August 2008 on Gut Records. It features previously unreleased material, b-sides, covers and live radio recordings from the previous four years.

Overview
The track "Amethyst" is taken from the band's debut EP, They Liked You Better When You Were Dead, in which it was track five. There was a hidden track directly after it titled "Hazy Eyes". The version of "Amethyst" on this album is the version from the EP with "Hazy Eyes" also included end of the track. It is not known if this was an error or if this was in fact meant to be on the track listing. The songs "Shinji Ikari", "Fight for US" and "NERV/SEELE" are about the anime Neon Genesis Evangelion. Also, Shinji Ikari is the name of the show's main protagonist while NERV and SEELE are the names of the two opposing factions from the series. The cover of "Breaking the Law" originally appeared on Higher Voltage!: Another Brief History of Rock.

The album also features an enhanced section with various videos featuring backstage footage, music video's and a video of the band answering questions asked by the fans.

The digital download version of the album has a slightly different track order, where track 4 is replaced, instead of "Amethyst", "Flotation Therapy" appears which was a b-side to "Floods".

The band's drummer Omar Abidi has since claimed that the release was a decision on the part of Gut Records, as a way of getting "every last drop of money out of us" before the band went independent; he argued that he felt that, after only two albums, it seemed arrogant for the band to be releasing such a collection.

Track listing 
The last 3 tracks on the album are printed in the wrong order on the inlay but are in the correct order here.
All songs written and composed by Fightstar, except where noted.

Personnel 
The following people contributed to Alternate Endings:

Fightstar 
 Charlie Simpson — lead vocals, rhythm guitar, keys, lyrics
 Alex Westaway — lead guitar, vocals, lyrics
 Dan Haigh – bass guitar, design
 Omar Abidi – drums, percussion

Production 
 Simon Asken - producer (tracks 1, 3, 5)
 Nick Fountain — engineer (tracks 1, 3, 5)
 Jason Wilson at Stakeout Studios – producer, mixing (tracks 2, 7, 8, 12, 13)
 Mark Williams – producer, mixing (track 4)
 Christian Wyland – producer, mixing (track 6)
 Carl Bown – producer, mixing (tracks 9, 11, 14)
 Matt Hyde – producer, mixing (tracks 10, 15)
 Matt Colton — mastering
 Daniel Conway — artwork, layout
 Craig Jennings — A&R

Chart performance

References 

2008 compilation albums
Fightstar albums